Kristiansand Bus Terminal (Kristiansand Rutebilstasjon) is the main bus terminal serving Kristiansand, Norway. It has bus lines to many places, including Oslo and Stavanger. The bus terminal is located next to Kristiansand Station and the city harbor. It was built between 1960 and 1965.

New terminal 
In 2017, Kristiansand municipality hosted a competition for architects to draw a new building to replace the old and outdated building from 1960. Asplan Viak's suggestion 'Natteravnen' was chosen as the winner, and construction was started in 2018 with plans to complete the new building by late 2019. PK Entreprenør from Søgne are responsible for building the new terminal. The existing building will be demolished when the new is completed, and replaced by a small park and green-spaces.

Platforms  

Bus lines from Rutebilstasjonen 

Bus lines from Vestre Strandgate & H. Wergelandsgate 

Night bus lines

References

Bus stations in Norway
Transport in Kristiansand